Mike Prpich (born March 27, 1982.) is a Canadian professional ice hockey player of Croatian ancestry. He plays both wing positions and is currently a member of the Kenaston Blizzard who play in the Sask Valley Hockey League

Playing career
Born in Kenaston, Saskatchewan, Prpich started his career as a junior for the Penticton Panthers in the BCHL where in the 2000–01 season he played 52 matches scoring 25 goals and 21 assists. Four years of study (2002–2006) at the University of North Dakota was the springboard for his future. Specifically, during this period in the NCAA he played in 160 games with 31 goals and 21 assists culminating with a conference title in his final year in 2006.

After his senior season of collegiate hockey, Prpich made his professional debut at the end of the 2005–06 season in a brief stint with the Iowa Stars of the AHL, playing only two games. However, in the 2006–07 season, as the member of the New Mexico Scorpions, who play in the CHL, he shined and has excelled in 64 duels with 23 goals and 22 assists. AHL and CHL experience opened doors to the highest British EIHL league  and the Cardiff Devils with whom he had spent two seasons. In his last season with the Devils he led the team scoring 35 goals and 34 assists in 57 games.

On June 30, 2009, Prpich signed a one-year contract with Croatian team KHL Medveščak in the Austrian Hockey League.  In the 2009–10 season, Prpich scored 6 goals in 47 games as the Bears progressed to the playoffs. On September 28, 2009, Mike was suspended for 3 games after fighting a Vienna Capitals player and finished the season amassing 116 penalty minutes.

Career statistics

References

External links 

Mike Prpich's profile at KHL Medveščak

1982 births
Canadian ice hockey forwards
Canadian people of Croatian descent
Cardiff Devils players
Iowa Stars players
KHL Medveščak Zagreb players
Living people
New Mexico Scorpions (CHL) players
North Dakota Fighting Hawks men's ice hockey players
Penticton Panthers players
Newcastle Vipers players
Canadian expatriate ice hockey players in England
Canadian expatriate ice hockey players in Wales
Canadian expatriate ice hockey players in Croatia
Canadian expatriate ice hockey players in the United States